Pulpit Rock is a coastal feature at Portland Bill, the southern tip of the Isle of Portland, Dorset, England. Intended to have the appearance of an open bible  leaning on a pulpit, Pulpit Rock was formed in the 1870s after a natural arch was cut away by quarrymen at Bill Quarry, and the leaning slab was added. As a quarrying relic, the rock is similar to that of Nicodemus Knob, another quarrying landmark on the island.

Pulpit Rock has become a popular tourist attraction on the island and is often photographed. Despite the danger, for many decades it has been a popular place for tombstoning. Pulpit Rock is also a popular point for wrasse anglers. The British record Ballan wrasse was caught there in 1998 by Pete Hegg.

The geological succession up from sea level is: Portland Cherty Series (up to the level of the neighbouring quarried platform), then Portland Freestone (the oolitic limestone quarried inland of Pulpit Rock), then a cap of thin-bedded limestones which are part of the basal Purbeck Formation.

See also
 List of rock formations in the United Kingdom
 Tar Rocks

References

External links

 Panoramic view

Headlands of Dorset
Isle of Portland
Rock formations of England
Tourist attractions in Dorset
Jurassic Coast